The Seven Natural Wonders of Africa was a competition where the seven were selected by voting on February 11, 2013.

Seven Wonders of Africa

See also

 Wonders of the World (disambiguation)
 Wonders of the World

References
https://my-traveltips.com/

Cultural lists
Geography of Africa
Nature-related lists